Transient receptor potential cation channel, subfamily C, member 2, also known as TRPC2, is a protein that in humans is encoded by the TRPC2 pseudogene.  This protein is not expressed in humans but is in certain other species such as mouse.

Interactions
TRPC2 has been shown to interact with TRPC6.

See also
 TRPC

References

Further reading

External links
 

Ion channels
Genes mutated in mice
Pseudogenes